Akalakunnam  is a village in Kottayam district in the state of Kerala, India.

Demographics
 India census, Akalakunnam had a population of 14,780 with 7,284 males and 7,496 females.

References

Villages in Kottayam district